The Rudolph and Dorothy C. Czufin House is a historic house in Ladue, Missouri, U.S.. It was built in 1950-1951 for Rudolph Czufin and his wife, Dorothy. It was designed by architects William Bernoudy and Edward Jules Mutrux. It has been listed on the National Register of Historic Places since July 12, 2002.

References

Houses on the National Register of Historic Places in Missouri
Houses completed in 1951
Houses in St. Louis County, Missouri
National Register of Historic Places in St. Louis